Three Points is a census-designated place (CDP) in Pima County, Arizona, United States. The population was 5,581 at the 2010 census.

History
According to David Leighton of the Arizona Daily Star newspaper, Three Points, also known as Robles Junction was founded in 1882. Bernabe S. Robles, who was born in 1857, in Baviácora, Sonora, Mexico. His family relocated to Tucson in 1864, where he grew up. After spending sometime in Florence, Arizona, he returned to Tucson and accepted a mail route to Gunsight, Arizona, near Ajo. It was during this time he located what is now called Robles Pass, near Cat (Back) Mountain, while searching for a shorter route to Gunsight. In 1882, he had his brother Jesús homesteaded 160 acres at what is now Robles Junction/Three Points. The brothers dug a well to set up a watering stop and stage station so Bernabe could water his horses along his mail route. He eventually gave up his mail route, and moved to the former watering stop/stage station, which at that point was called the Robles Ranch. He and his family ran the ranch for many years, even after the family had moved back to Tucson. Robles died in 1945. The old ranch house is now the Three Points/Robles Junction Community Center.

Geography
Three Points is located at  (32.048652, -111.285174).

Demographics

As of the census of 2000, there were 5,273 people, 1,772 households, and 1,304 families living in the CDP. The racial makeup of the CDP was 70.6% White or European American, 0.7% Black or African American, 2.5% Native American, 0.4% Asian, 0.1% Pacific Islander, 22.2% from other races, and 3.49% from two or more races.  40.8% of the population were Hispanic or Latino of any race.

There were 1,772 households, out of which 38.5% had children under the age of 18 living with them, 56.9% were married couples living together, 10.9% had a female householder with no husband present, and 26.4% were non-families. 19.8% of all households were made up of individuals, and 5.1% had someone living alone who was 65 years of age or older.  The average household size was 2.98 and the average family size was 3.46.

In the CDP, the population was spread out, with 31.8% under the age of 18, 8.1% from 18 to 24, 29.0% from 25 to 44, 23.6% from 45 to 64, and 7.5% who were 65 years of age or older.  The median age was 33 years. For every 100 females, there were 106.5 males.  For every 100 females age 18 and over, there were 102.4 males.

The median income for a household in the CDP was $31,486, and the median income for a family was $35,229. Males had a median income of $28,642 versus $22,857 for females. The per capita income for the CDP was $13,088.  About 18.0% of families and 22.1% of the population were below the poverty line, including 30.0% of those under age 18 and 12.8% of those age 65 or over.

References

Census-designated places in Pima County, Arizona
Populated places in the Sonoran Desert
Census-designated places in Arizona